L'Île de Sept Villes is the third album by the Toronto-based instrumental band Hylozoists. It is nominated for a Juno Award in 2010 for Instrumental Album of the Year.

Track listing
"The Possibility of an Island"
"Bras d'Or Lakes"
"The Island Of Seven Cities (FSR)"
"Bubbles&Wheezy"
"Dark Scene Waltz"
"Your Band Doesn't Have The Legs I Thought It Would"
"Parents Don't Let Your Children Grow up to Be Compressed"
"The French Settle In"
"Acadia Acadia"
"Soixante-Sept"

References 

2009 albums
The Hylozoists albums